The Towers of Avarice is Zero Hour's second album, and their first on the Sensory record label. The album is conceptual, with a story reminiscent of the Silent Era movie Metropolis.

The album has been called "the quintessential progressive metal album of the new millennium" by Sea of Tranquility reviewer Murat Batmaz. When asked about the production on the album, producer Dino Alden stated that "Zero Hour has always been quite disciplined and they are very well rehearsed before they come into the studio. They always make pre-production recordings on their own and they work very hard at getting the arrangement that they want for each song."

Track listing
 "The Towers of Avarice"  – 7:52
 "The Subterranean"  – 4:11
 "Stratagem"  – 8:06
 "Reflections"  – 3:56
 "Demise and Vestige"  – 15:47
 "The Ghosts of Dawn"  – 5:30

Credits
 Erik Rosvold - vocals, keyboards
 Jasun Tipton - guitars, keyboards
 Troy Tipton - bass
 Mike Guy - drums
 Travis Smith - Artwork

References

2001 albums
Albums with cover art by Travis Smith (artist)